The Hawwara, also spelled Huwwara, Howwara, Hewwara or Houara, is a large tribal confederation of Berbers and Arabized Berbers spread widely in the Maghreb, with descendants in Upper Egypt and Sudan. Hawwara are amongst the most prominent tribes in Upper Egypt, with branches found mainly in Qena. In Sudan, they are labelled as Hawwaweer (plural of Hawwara), and have a significant political presence.

Branches 
The Hawwara were composed of numerous tribes and clans. Some of them are: the Addasa, the Andara, the Awtita, the Baswa, the Gharyan, the Haragha, the Banu Irmazyan, the Kaldin, the Kamlan, the Karkuda, the Lahan or Lahana, the Maghar, the Malila, the Maslata, the Mindasa or Mindas (Mandasa, Mandas), the Misrata, the Razin, the Satat, the Tarhuna, the Wannifan, the Warfalla, the Wargha, the Warsatifa, the Washtata, the Yaghmorasen, the Zakkawa and the Zanzafa.

History
The Hawwara are the heirs of the ancient western Bavarians, in antiquity the Hawwara were one of the principal tribes located within the Masaesyli state. The traditional territory that was called Avaritana/Abaritana provincia by Quodvultdeus of Carthage later became known as “bilad Haouara”, country of the Haouara (of the Aurès) in the middle ages. During the Byzantine period the area called “Abaritana atque Getulia provincia” was a tribal principality and the Hawwara were one of the two major ruling confederations. Medieval historians have also attested the presence of the Hawwara in the Aurès region well before the arrival of the Arabs in the 7th century. Edrici placed the location of the Hawwara in the plains of M’Sila. From the 8th century to 12th century, the eastern boundaries of their land ran through Tawergha, Waddan, and Zella. Hawwara's territory was bordered to the east by the Mazata tribe.

Families belonging to the Hawwara founded and ruled small Islamic kingdoms in Al-Andalus (Spain) such as the Taifa of Toledo and Taifa of Albarracín. The latter still being the name of a Spanish town named Albarracín or Al Banu Razin, a sub-tribe of Hawwara. Other Spanish cities including Alhaurín el Grande and Alhaurín de la Torre also get there name from the Hawwara (Al Hawwariyin).

A fraction of the Hawwara were part the Fatimid army that conquered Egypt, Syria, Palestine and Jordan. After the conquest, they were given land grants by the Fatimid caliphs. The Hawwara tribe became dominant in al-Buhayra in Egypt. In 1380/1381, Barquq, Sultan of the Mamluks, established some Hawwara groups in Upper Egypt and granted the Iqta' of Girga to the Hawwari chief, Isma'il ibn Mazin. Isma'il was succeeded by Umar, the eponymous of the Banu Umar clan. According to Al-Maqrizi in his book ‘kitāb as-sulūk’, a group of Hawwara together with a group of Arabs from Upper Egypt attacked the wali of Aswan in the month of Rajab 798 (April 1396 A.D.) and made an alliance with the Arab tribe of Banu Kanz who inhabited Aswan. Al-Maqrizi also writes in his book ‘Al Khetat’ that in the month of Muharram 815 (1412 A.D.) the Hawwara tribesmen proceeded to Aswan and attacked the Banu Kanz Arabs. The Arab men fled, but many of them were killed while the women and children were taken into slavery. They destroyed the walls of the city and left it in ruins, without inhabitants. After sacking al-Fayyum in 1485, the Hawwara tribes became the true rulers of Upper Egypt.

In Egypt's history, the Southern region is the cradle of tribal settlements. By the 19th century, Southern Egypt and Northern Nubia were completely ruled-over by the Egyptian Hawwara tribe. Governance had become decentralized as the Hawwara spread their sovereignty over ten provinces and parts of the other remaining twenty-one provinces in Upper Egypt. The Egyptian Hawwara branch was deemed to be the de facto rulers of Upper Egypt and their authority spanned across North Africa, up until the campaigns of Ibrahim Pasha in 1813, which finally crushed their dominant influence, and made them flee in masses to the Sudan.

In past times, and before fleeing into Sudan due to the campaigns of Ibrahim Pasha targeting them, during the Mamluk era in Egypt, the Hawwara were the most influential tribe in Upper Egypt under the leadership of Sheikh Hammam. Sultan Barquq made relationships with the Hawwara in order to keep the Arab tribes from becoming powerful. Towards the end of the Mamluk dynasty, the Hawwara and Arabs began cooperating to kill Mamluks. Due to their cooperation, the Mamluks labelled the Hawwara as being Arab. Although like many they are rather arabized, the term "Sheikh of the Arabs" is usually bestowed upon any tribal leaders, however, according to Burckhardt, the Hawwara claim their ancient origin to be from the Maghreb region.

Notable Hawaris
 Ismail al-Zahir, king of the Taifa of Toledo.
 Al-Mamun of Toledo, king of the Taifa of Toledo.
 Yahya al-Qadir, king of the Taifa of Toledo.
 Sheikh Al-Arab Hammam, Sheikh of the Egyptian Hawwara tribe during the 18th century.

References 

Arabized Berbers
Berber peoples and tribes
Ethnic groups in Sudan
Berbers in Egypt
Berbers in Algeria
Berbers in Tunisia
Berbers in Morocco
Berbers in Spain
Tribes of Libya
Moroccan tribes
Upper Egypt